Charlotte Savary (born 24 December 1979) is a French singer and songwriter, participating in electropop, trip hop and folk music projects. These projects are SEYES and Wax Tailor. She also was a singer in two bands called Clover and Felipecha, and released her solo debut in 2016.

Discography
 2004 : Clover – World's End Lane
 2004 : Wax Tailor – Lost The Way (EP)
 2005 : Wax Tailor – Tales of the Forgotten Melodies (featured on "Our Dance")
 2006 : Wax Tailor – Our dance / Walk the line (EP)
 2007 : Wax Tailor – Hope & Sorrow (featured on "The man With No Soul", "To Dry Up" et "Alien in My Belly")
 2007 : Wax Tailor – The games you play / To dry up (EP)
 2008 : Felipecha – De fil en aiguille
 2009 : Wax Tailor – In The Mood For Life (featured on "Dragon Chasers", "Go Without Me" et "Fireflies" and "Greenfields")
 2011 : Felipecha – Les Lignes de Fuite
 2012 : Wax Tailor - Dusty Rainbow from the Dark(featured on "Dusty Rainbow")
 2014 : Wax Tailor & The Phonovison Symphony Orchestra - Live
 2016 : Charlotte Savary - Seasons
 2016 : Wax Tailor & The Phonovison Symphony Orchestra - By Any Beats Necessary (featured on "Bleed Away" with Tricky)
 2020 : SEYES - "Beauty Dies", new downtempo/trip-hop female duet
 2020 : DENDANA - "Je n'ai pas les mots" (featured on "Rising Of The Veil" and "Tout Finira", backing singer on all tracks)

External links

Charlotte Savary on Discogs

French singer-songwriters
People from Saint-Germain-en-Laye
1979 births
Living people
21st-century French singers
21st-century French women singers